Laurence William Grensted (1884–1964) was a British Anglican priest and theologian. He was Nolloth Professor of the Philosophy of the Christian Religion, associated with Oriel College at the University of Oxford.

Laurence Grensted studied at University College, Oxford and was subsequently a Fellow and Chaplain there from 1924 to 1930. He was the author of A Short History of the Doctrine of the Atonement, published in 1920.

Grensted delivered the 1930 Bampton Lectures at Oxford on Psychology and God, a study of the implications of recent psychology for religious belief and practice.

Grensted was a member of the Royal Entomological Society. He was later Canon and then Canon Emeritus at Liverpool Cathedral.

Photographs of Laurence Grensted are held in the collection of the National Portrait Gallery, London.

References

External links
 L. W. Grensted publications from WorldCat

1884 births
1964 deaths
Alumni of University College, Oxford
Fellows of University College, Oxford
Chaplains of University College, Oxford
Nolloth Professors of the Philosophy of the Christian Religion
Canons (priests)
20th-century English Anglican priests